Mor Stein is a neolithic standing stone in the southeastern part of the island of Shapinsay, Orkney Islands, Scotland.  Shapinsay is one of the two large inner islands of the Orkney group, and it is situated approximately two miles north of the Orkney Mainland. Linton Bay is situated slightly to the northeast of Mor Stein.

A few miles to the north is Burroughston Broch with its earth cladding intact, allowing visitors to peer down into the broch from above.

See also

References

Prehistoric Orkney
Archaeological sites in Orkney
Shapinsay
Neolithic Scotland
Megalithic monuments in Scotland
Scheduled monuments in Scotland